E-government began in South Korea in the 1980s when the Ministry of Government Administration and Home Affairs (MOGAHA) began to implement ICT within government, based on the "National Backbone Computer Network" consisting of five national networks. An Information Super-Highway was launched in 1993, followed by the creation of the Ministry of Information and Communication (MIC). Public access to government information services began to move online in the late 1990s; and a drive for "Participatory Government" gave further impetus for e-government after 2002, led by the 2003 "E-Government Roadmap" which sets a number of specific targets.

Defining e-Government
The term "Electronic Government" first appeared in official documents in September 1993, on page 112 of a report for government reform by the Clinton administration ("Creating A Government that Works Better and Costs Less: From Red Tape to Results"). The United Nations has defined the concept "e-government", or "Digital Government", as "The employment of the Internet and the world-wide-web for delivering government information and services to the citizens". (United Nations, 2006; AOEMA, 2005). E-Government involves "[t]he utilization of IT, ICTs, and other web-based telecommunication technologies services to improve and/or enhance on the efficiency and effectiveness of service delivery in the public sector." (Jeong, 2007).

E-government uses technologies to facilitate the smooth operation of government functions, and the disbursement of government information and services to the people. E-government has enhanced office automation in the public sector, through the utilization of the Internet and wireless technologies to connect telephones, fax machines, and printers. This is especially relevant for those public-sector fields where staff are constantly on the move, such as police officers and project managers.

History

The beginning (1960s–1970s)
South Korea's E-Government project first started as part of the office automation efforts for statistical analysis work in the Economy Planning Board (EPB) with the introduction of computers in 1967. At the time, it was the Committee on Coordination for Development of Computerized Organization established in 1967 under the Ministry of Science and Technology (MOST) that supplied computers to each ministry in the government.

In a survey conducted a decade later on supply and management of computers in government agencies by MOST in 1977, it was found that computers had greatly contributed to fast and accurate results in simple arithmetic tasks such as payroll and personnel management, calculations for phone bills, grading tests and so on, in central agencies such as the Ministry of Culture and Education, Ministry of Communication and Postal Service, and the National Tax Agency. However, in 1978, the need for informatization rather than simple automation of menial tasks brought about the start of the E-Government initiative aiming to realize a more advanced model of E-Government.

Moves to introduce ICT into government took the form of E-Government projects for building necessary infrastructure to achieve this end, under the "Five Year Basic Plan on Informatizaton of Public Administration". These efforts, led by the Ministry of Government Administration and Home Affairs (MOGAHA), paved the way for implementation of South Korea's advanced informatization policies in the 1980s.

Building the infrastructure for E-government (1980s–1990s)
The decision to build a "National Backbone Computer Network" and subsequent enactments of laws such as the Computer Program Protection Act and Supply and Utilization of Computer Network Act in 1986, and the Software Development Promotion Act in 1987, secured technology and infrastructure vital to realizing e-governance. These efforts led to a concrete plan and project engagements for the "National Backbone Computer Network" project that would become the communications and information network for the public sector. Under this plan, five national network projects – administration, finance, education and research, defense, and security – were launched.

This period was also a turning point for the infrastructure of e-governance in Korea. In 1993, a basic plan for building the foundation for the Information Super-Highway was announced, and the Ministry of Information and Communication (MIC) was launched in 1994. The following year saw the enactment by the National Assembly of the "Framework on Informatization Promotion Act", which became the basis for policies on informatization and e-governance. Based on this Act, the "Informatization Promotion Committee" was created along with the "Informatization Promotion Fund," to act as the steering head for informatization and E-Government initiatives. This act also provided a firm basis for implementing E-Government initiatives such as the Chief Information Officer (CIO) system. During the latter half of the 90s, the first Informatization Promotion conference was held at the Blue House on October 14, 1996, where President Kim Young-sam's ideas on E-Government were announced in the form of a report, "Informatization Strategy for Strengthening National Competitiveness". In 1997, an evaluation system for informatization projects was introduced while plans were made for implementation of the second stage of advanced ICT.

Full-scale implementation of E-Government (2000–Present)
With the inauguration of the Kim Dae-jung administration in 1998, the official government homepage went online and Internet-based civil services, such as real estate registration, became available. Presidential executive orders for appointing CIOs in the public sector and guidelines for sharing administrative information were established as well. In 1999 a comprehensive E-Government implementation plan was created, while civil services based on integrated civil application information system and comprehensive statistical information system were introduced.

By 2001, halfway into the term of the Kim Dae-jung administration, South Korea passed the first comprehensive legislation on E-Government, the "Promotion of Digitalization of Administrative Work for E-Government Realization Act". The SCEG began work in February of the same year, holding 12 executive and two general meetings where detailed plans for implementation, as well as funding for the 11 newly selected key E-Government projects, listed in (Table 1), were drawn up and reported to the President on 7 May 2001.

With the inauguration of Participatory Government under President Roh Moo-hyun from 2002, policies for E-Government became focused on ways to extend informatization. The former PCGI was restructured into PCGID (Presidential Committee on Government Innovation and Decentralization), encompassing E-Government, administrative reform, fiscal and tax reform, and decentralization. From each of the sub-committees in charge of these areas, implementation plans centered on the presidential agenda were announced as Roadmap tasks.

For e-governance, the "Participatory Government's Vision and Direction of E-Government" was announced in May 2003, and the "E-Government Roadmap" based on the vision of realizing the "World's Best Open E-Government" was released in August of the same year. The roadmap is divided into four areas, 10 agenda, 31 tasks and managed in terms of 45 detailed subtasks. It sets specific targets, including: to increase online public services to 85%; to attain a top 10 ranking in the world for business support competitiveness; to reduce visits for civil service applicants to 3 per year; and to raise the utilization rate of E-Government programs to 60%.

Development and implementation issues

See also
Government of South Korea

References

External links
 Korea e-Government Portal site
 Korea e-Government Webzine
 Korea's Government Integrated Data Center Sets a New Benchmark on e-Government IT

South Korea
Government of South Korea
Science and technology in South Korea